International Nuclear Services (INS) is a United Kingdom company involved in the management and transport of nuclear fuels. INS is based near Whitehaven, in Cumbria and is operated by Nuclear Transport Solutions, a wholly owned subsidiary of the UK Government's Nuclear Decommissioning Authority (NDA).

History
INS began as the Spent Fuel Services division of British Nuclear Fuels (BNFL). As part of the restructuring of BNFL, 49% of the business was transferred to the NDA in 2006. It was renamed International Nuclear Services in 2007 and in April 2008, as BNFL was wound up, the NDA acquired the remaining 51% of INS.

Operations
INS offers management, consultancy and transport services covering uranium, MOX fuel, irradiated fuel and nuclear waste. It also acts as the NDA's commercial arm, managing contracts for services provided from the NDA's Sellafield and Dounreay sites. As part of this role it works alongside the NDA's Direct Rail Services subsidiary, which transports nuclear materials in the UK by rail.

Pacific Nuclear Transport Limited
INS conducts most of its transport operations through specialist nuclear materials shipping company Pacific Nuclear Transport Limited (PNTL), in which it has a controlling 62.5% stake. PNTL's remaining shares are owned by Areva (12.5%) and a consortium of Japanese nuclear companies (25%). PNTL's fleet is dedicated to carrying nuclear materials and transports most of its cargoes between Europe and Japan.

The fleet of three ships is managed by Serco, which also operates two ships for INS. The vessels are armed for self-defence, and carry a contingent of the Civil Nuclear Constabulary on board to operate the armament.

References

External links

 International Nuclear Services
 Pacific Nuclear Transport Limited

Nuclear technology in the United Kingdom
Nuclear fuel companies
Nuclear waste companies
Government-owned companies of the United Kingdom
2006 establishments in England
Waste companies established in 2006
British companies established in 2006